Now Pluvial is an EP released in October 2006 by the British band These New Puritans. It was released on Angular Records and the catalogue number is ARC016. The EP was a self distributed limited edition of 500 numbered copies.

Track listing 
 "Elvis" – 2:46
 "C16th" – 1:38
 "En Papier" – 4:55

References 

2006 EPs
Angular Recording Corporation albums